Franklin & Bash is an American comedy-drama television series created by Kevin Falls and Bill Chais. The series starred Breckin Meyer and Mark-Paul Gosselaar as unconventional lawyers and longtime friends. A Turner Broadcasting executive referred to the series as a "funny legal procedural", whereas in the United Kingdom it was referred to as "Ally McBeal with Balls" when advertised for its forthcoming debut on E4.

The series was broadcast in the United States on cable channel TNT. It premiered on June 1, 2011. The second season aired June 5, 2012, and the third on June 19, 2013. The show was renewed for a fourth season on October 17, 2013, which premiered August 13, 2014. On November 11, 2014, TNT canceled Franklin & Bash after four seasons.

Overview

The characters Franklin and Bash, for whom the show is named, are an unlikely duo of streetwise attorneys. After defeating Damien Karp of the prestigious law firm Infeld & Daniels, LLC (colloquially "Infeld Daniels"), they are recruited by co-founder and managing partner Stanton Infeld to breathe new life into the ailing firm with the duo reminding Stanton of his early days with his partner the late Daniels. Assisting Franklin and Bash is Carmen Phillips, an ex-convict out on parole who assists with background investigations on cases, and Pindar Singh, a brilliant, agoraphobic attorney and classmate of theirs.

In agreeing to work for Infeld Daniels, Franklin and Bash were guaranteed that they would still be taking on the same kind of cases as before, only with the backing of a major law firm. Over the course of their cases Franklin and Bash, through their courtroom antics, prove to be effective advocates for their clients, much to the chagrin of Damien Karp and his ex-girlfriend fellow attorney Hanna Linden.

Unbeknownst to the titular duo, Karp and Linden have been clandestinely stockpiling files on the team in the hopes that enough infractions will motivate Infeld to fire them. However, after assisting Franklin & Bash in military court, Linden tried to delete the entire file, failing to hide the file from the NY firm partners.

The duo later learn their hiring was a move by Infeld to protect the firm from a leveraged buyout by any firm, particularly Franklin's father's firm, Franklin and Franklin. Although the pair feel understandably manipulated, the team still work to save Infeld Daniels from the attempted takeover. Infeld arrives at their house offering his regrets about the lie.

In Season 3's "Coffee and Cream", the firm is renamed Infeld•Daniels•King LLC, with the hiring/buying in of Rachel King, a lawyer who had worked with Karp years ago and had recently humiliated Franklin and Bash on national television. Infeld hired her in hopes of restoring some of the corporate culture lost with the changes Franklin and Bash brought in with their own hiring.

In season 4, it is revealed that Rachel King fled to Croatia after embezzling money from clients and Stanton is believed to be her accomplice, leading to his suspension from the bar. He leaves Peter and Jared in charge, effectively making the firm Infeld•Daniels•Franklin•Bash LLC. Pindar and Carmen have left and are replaced by new lawyer Anita Haskins and Dan Mundy, a new investigator. Also joining the firm is Ellen Swatello, who has left the DA's office and taken a job with the firm to work with Stanton Infeld, becoming dismayed at learning of his disbarment and having to work for Peter and Jared.

Cast and characters

Main
 Breckin Meyer as Elmo "Jared" Franklin, Duke of Landingshire, the snarky, self-confident party-boy son of a famous trial lawyer. In season 2, it is revealed that his real first name is Elmo, a name which his family passes down from father to son. In season 4, he and Peter become name partners at the firm after Stanton is disbarred and leaves them in charge.
 Mark-Paul Gosselaar as Peter Bash, Franklin's best friend and legal partner. He is (slightly) more mature and level-headed than Franklin. In season 4, he and Jared become name partners at the firm after Stanton is disbarred and leaves them in charge.
 Malcolm McDowell as Stanton Infeld, who is eccentric and yet easy-going. Stanton is a senior partner in the prominent law firm Infeld-Daniels. After witnessing their unconventional techniques in court, he hires Franklin and Bash due to their resemblance to him and a partner back in his early days of his law firm. In season 4, he is suspended from the bar after Rachel King's embezzlement and takes a job as an auto mechanic.
 Reed Diamond as Damien Karp, Stanton's nephew, former senior partner for Infeld Daniels, who become jealous of Franklin and Bash's good standing and quick success with his uncle. He was once in a relationship with Hanna Linden, but is no longer because he refuses to have relations with a co-worker. Surprisingly, Karp has no interest in taking over his uncle's firm as he yearns to be a judge, since his childhood days. Karp is amenable to Hanna Linden taking over instead. With the arrival of Rachel, Karp is more determined than ever to fast track his road to a judgeship. He was a senior partner at another firm as of the season 4 premier, but later rejoined Infeld-Daniels at Stanton's request.
 Dana Davis as Carmen Phillips (seasons 1–3), an ex-convict working for Franklin and Bash as their private personal investigator. She does not appear in "Good Lovin", "Freck" and "Shoot to Thrill" in season 3, her absence is not explained in these episodes. The season 4 premiere reveals that Carmen and Pindar left the firm.
 Kumail Nanjiani as Pindar ("Pindy") Singh (seasons 1–3), an agoraphobic lawyer working for Franklin and Bash, who first met the duo during their law school days. In season 3, his absence is not explained in the "Control" and "Out of the Blue" episodes. The season 4 premiere reveals that Carmen and Pindar left the firm. He said he left the show because of his new show Silicon Valley, and that Pindy's departure will be explained. "Yeah, I actually had to leave Franklin & Bash to do Silicon Valley, so you'll see in the new season that we figure out a way to hand it off to another character in a really funny way."
 Garcelle Beauvais as Hanna Linden (seasons 1–2), a senior partner working for Infeld Daniels, and Karp's ex-girlfriend who uses Franklin's affections to get back at Damien. Infeld has stated he sees her as running the future of his law firm when he decides to eventually step down as managing partner. Linden was a member of the ROTC and following her time in law school, she served in the United States Navy as a JAG attorney for a year. In "Coffee and Cream" Jared mentions that she left for a better senior partnership at the Buget & Towne law firm. 
 Heather Locklear as Rachel Rose King (season 3), a trial lawyer who joins the firm as a newly named on-door law partner, causing it to be renamed Infeld•Daniels•King LLC. At the beginning of season 4, it is revealed that she fled to Croatia after embezzling money from clients.
 Toni Trucks as Anita Haskins (season 4), a smart, professional law school graduate who joins the firm for a chance to actually try cases as opposed to doing research.
 Anthony Ordonez as Dan Mundy (season 4), the firm's eccentric new investigator. He has a number of strange mannerisms, such as appearing out of nowhere and liberally interpreting Peter and Jared's requests. It is loosely implied that he has a military or intelligence background.

Recurring
 Claire Coffee as Janie Ross (seasons 1–2), an Assistant DA and Peter Bash's ex-girlfriend.
 Beau Bridges as Elmo "Leonard" Franklin (seasons 1–2), Jared Franklin's father. Their family passes the name Elmo from father to son, though they adopt other names for everyday use.
 Alexandra Holden as Debbie Wilcox (season 1), an assistant to Franklin and Bash. Her absence from the series midway through season 1 onward is never explained. 
 Rhea Seehorn as Ellen Swatello (seasons 1, 3–4), an assistant DA who is overshadowed by Janie Ross and dislikes Franklin & Bash. In season 3, she and Jared start a sexual relationship. In season 4, she leaves the DA's office and takes a job at Infeld-Daniels.
 Kathy Najimy as Judge Alice Sturgess (season 1). Sturgess is no fan of the titular attorneys and has even in her career cited them for contempt of court. Rather than giving the duo an opportunity to cull potential clients from inside jail, Sturgess instead placed the pair under house arrest.
 Gates McFadden as Judge Mallory Jacobs (season 1–4), a judge who gravely dislikes the duo.
 Kat Foster as Wendy Cowell (seasons 2, 4), an LAPD officer who dated Bash.
 Robert Wuhl as Judge Maxwell Nulis (season 2–4), a judge who admires the duo.
 Nicky Whelan as "Charlie" Charlotte (season 3), beach house neighbor, kinesiologist and love interest for Bash
 Jane Seymour (season 2–4) as Colleen Bash, mother of Peter Bash and a sex surrogate.
 Yuji Nagata (season 3) as himself, boyfriend of Colleen Bash.

Development and production
The series was originally in development for the TBS network.  In February 2010, TBS placed a cast-contingent pilot order from a script written by Kevin Falls and Bill Chais. Casting announcements began in early March, with Meyer and Gosselaar taking starring roles as the title characters. Next to be cast was McDowell, as Stanton Infeld. Then, comedian Nanjiani was cast as Pindar Singh, followed by Diamond, as Damien Karp, and Beauvais and Davis as Hanna Linden and Carmen Phillips respectively.

The pilot was filmed in Atlanta in late March and early April. In May 2010, the show was moved from TBS to sister station TNT, where network executives believed it was a better fit. The network green-lit production in mid-May with a ten episode order, with production moving to Los Angeles.

Reception

Critical reception
Franklin & Bash received mixed reviews from TV critics. On Metacritic, the show has a score of 56 out of 100, based on 21 critics, indicating "mixed or average reviews". On Rotten Tomatoes, the show holds a rating of 61%, based on 17 reviews, with an average rating of 6/10. The site's consensus reads, "Slick, playful, and occasionally witty, Franklin & Bash unfortunately sticks too close to the courtroom drama formula".

The Los Angeles Times described the pilot episode as "not as intrigue-heavy as White Collar, as satiric as The Good Guys or as beautifully located as Hawaii Five-0; 'Franklin & Bash' is smart, it's fun and it's summer." Variety gave a positive review, describing the show as "playful, silly and wholly unpretentious." The Hollywood Reporter also gave the pilot a positive review: 
In the end, Franklin & Bash uses the legal genre to prop up what is mostly a buddy story. There may be bigger reveals ahead and certain daring complications, but no doubt Franklin and Bash will get out of them with their good looks and quick wits. That’s how they roll – mostly – on TNT.

Ratings
The pilot episode premiered with 2.7 million total viewers, scoring 1.1 million viewers in the 18–49 demographic and 1.2 million in the 25–54 demographic, making it the fourth most watched cable-program of the evening. Live + 3 day ratings for the series premiere updated those numbers to 3.5 million total viewers, scoring 1.5 million viewers in the 18–49 demographic, 1.6 million in the 25–54 demographic and 0.7 million in the 18–34 demographic.

Home media
Sony Pictures Home Entertainment have released the first three seasons of Franklin & Bash in Region 1, and the first three seasons in Region 2.

Broadcast
Franklin & Bash premiered in Canada on Bravo! on August 22, 2011. For the fourth season, the show was moved to M3.
In the UK the show premiered on July 13, 2011 on E4. On November 8, 2011 it began showing on M-Net in South Africa. In Australia it premiered on FX on June 6, 2012.

References

External links

2010s American comedy-drama television series
2010s American legal television series
2011 American television series debuts
2014 American television series endings
English-language television shows
Fictional duos
Television duos
Television series by Sony Pictures Television
Television shows set in Los Angeles
TNT (American TV network) original programming